Thomas Simpson Sproule (October 25, 1843 – November 10, 1917) was a Canadian parliamentarian, Speaker of the House of Commons of Canada from 1911–1915, and a member of the Canadian Senate from 1915–1917.

Early life and education
Sproule was born to James and Jane (née Mitchell) Sproule, farmers who had emigrated to King Township, Canada West from County of Tyrone, Ireland.

His parents moved to Grey County when he was young, and he attended public schools there before studying at University of Michigan and Victoria University in Cobourg. He left school for two years before returning to Victoria University, graduating in 1868 with a degree in medicine.

Doctor, businessman, politician, and husband

After his graduation, Sproule first practised medicine at Craighurst, Ontario, before he moved to Galesburg, Michigan. He moved back to Grey County, and settled in Markdale, Ontario, where in addition to his medical practice, he also opened a drug store, bought a large cattle farm, and invested in local businesses such as a flour mill and lumber yard.

He turned to politics and succeeded the retiring William Kingston Flesher as MP of Grey East in the 1878 election as a Conservative MP. He also fell in love with Flesher's daughter, Mary Alice, and wooed her by having a beautiful Italianate house that he called Knarsboro Hall built for her in Markdale. The couple was married in 1881, and had a daughter, Lillian.

Sproule was also related to the famous NHL Toronto St. Patricks owner Harvey Sproule. Thomas Sproule's niece was Mary Elizabeth Sproule Head, of Milton, Ontario, who along with her husband, John Head, cared for her young nephew Harvey Sproule and his sister.

Sproule was subsequently re-elected to Parliament eight times in succession. Both Sproule and his wife were dedicated teetotallers and Prohibitionists, and when Mary Alice Sproule was the hostess of her husband's political functions, she never allowed alcohol to be served.

Political views
Sproule was a staunch Protestant from an Irish Unionist background. He was a member of the Orange Order, and rose to the position of "Master and Sovereign." In 1906, he became "President of the Imperial Grand Council of the World." The Order was noted for its anti-French and anti-Catholic views, particularly at the time.

As a Conservative MP, he was a supporter of Canadian Prime Minister Sir John A. Macdonald, but his loyalty to Orangeism led him to differ with his party's leadership on issues of language and religion, particularly on the Manitoba Schools Question. Sproule opposed any concession to Catholic separate schools or French-language instruction.

Following the fall of the Conservative government in the 1896 election, largely by the divisions over the school issue, he became a pronounced critic of the immigration policies of Sir Wilfrid Laurier's government. Sproule opposed the admission to Canada of non-British migrants. He supported the abolition of French-language instruction in Ontario schools, and the implementation of Regulation 17. Sproule also opposed the expansion of French-language services by the federal government.

Speaker of the House
Following the defeat of the Laurier government in the 1911 election, the new Conservative Prime Minister, Robert Laird Borden, nominated Sproule to the position of Speaker of the House of Commons. Because Sproule had to lead the House in prayers in both English and French, he embarked on French lessons despite being a lifelong opponent of the language.

During a thirty-six-day filibuster on the question of the government's naval bill, Sproule lost his patience after weeks of 24-hour sessions, and became the first Speaker ever to "name" a member of the House for disorderly conduct.

Illness and death
Sproule was forced to retire from the Speakership due to ill health, and was named to the Senate of Canada in 1915. He served for two years until his death in 1917. Four years after his death, Sproule's wife Mary Alice sold Knarsboro Hall, the house Sproule had built for her, and went to live with her daughter where she stayed until her death in 1941.

References

External links 

1843 births
1917 deaths
Physicians from Ontario
Canadian senators from Ontario
Conservative Party of Canada (1867–1942) MPs
Conservative Party of Canada (1867–1942) senators
Members of the House of Commons of Canada from Ontario
Speakers of the House of Commons of Canada
People from King, Ontario
University of Michigan alumni